Zhen'an railway station is a railway station located in Linbian Township, Pingtung County, Taiwan. It is located on the Pingtung line and is operated by Taiwan Railways. The defunct Donggang line branched off from this station.

When the station was opened in 1940, it had two side platforms, one for the Pingtung line and the other for the Donggang line. However, when the Donggang line closed in 1991, the second platform was abandoned. On October 16, 2019, the second platform was rebuilt to serve a second track built between Nanzhou and Linbian as part of the Pingtung line's electrification process.

References

1940 establishments in Taiwan
Railway stations opened in 1940
Railway stations in Pingtung County
Railway stations served by Taiwan Railways Administration